Stéphanie Arricau (born 14 June 1973 in Orthez) is a French professional golfer. She studied marketing and management and had a long amateur career as a junior and an adult before turning professional at the age of 26. She has played on the Ladies European Tour since 2000, winning the Unión Fenosa Open de España Femenino and the Arras Open de France Damesin 2004 and the KLM Ladies Dutch Open and the Estoril Ladies Open of Portugal in 2006. She was a member of the U.S.-based LPGA Tour in 2005, but failed to retain her card. She represented France in the 2005 and 2007 Women's World Cup of Golf.

Professional wins (4)

Ladies European Tour wins (4)
2004 Unión Fenosa Open de España Femenino, Arras Open de France Dames
2006 KLM Ladies Open, Estoril Ladies Open of Portugal

Team appearances
Amateur
European Ladies' Team Championship (representing France): 1997, 1999 (winners)
Espirito Santo Trophy (representing France): 1998

Professional
World Cup (representing France): 2005, 2007

References

French female golfers
Ladies European Tour golfers
LPGA Tour golfers
Sportspeople from Pyrénées-Atlantiques
Sportspeople from Toulouse
People from Orthez
1973 births
Living people
21st-century French women